Borș is a commune in Bihor County, Crișana, Romania. It is composed of four villages: Borș, Santăul Mare (Nagyszántó), Santăul Mic (Kisszántó) and Sântion (Biharszentjános). There is an important border crossing with Hungary near Borș, both for road traffic (DN1) and rail traffic (CFR Line 300).

Demographics
In 2002, 92.7% of inhabitants were Hungarians, 6% Romanians and 0.9% Roma.

References

Communes in Bihor County
Localities in Crișana
Hungary–Romania border crossings